Serge Dupire (born 23 May 1958) is a Canadian actor.

Selected filmography

References

External links
 

1958 births
Living people
Canadian male film actors
Male actors from Quebec
Canadian male television actors